The Council of Jerusalem or Apostolic Council is a council described in chapter 15 of the Acts of the Apostles, allegedly held in Jerusalem around .

The council decided that Gentile converts to Christianity were not obligated to keep most of the rules prescribed to the Jews by the Mosaic Law, such as Jewish dietary laws and other specific rituals, including the rules concerning circumcision of males. The council did, however, retain the prohibitions on eating blood, meat containing blood, and meat of animals that were strangled, and on fornication and idolatry, sometimes referred to as the Apostolic Decree. The purpose and origin of these four prohibitions is debated.

Accounts of the council are found in Acts of the Apostles (chapter 15 in two different forms, the Alexandrian and Western versions) and also possibly in Paul's letter to the Galatians (chapter 2). Some scholars dispute that Galatians 2 is about the Council of Jerusalem, while others have defended this identification.

Historical background

Jerusalem was the first center of the Christian Church according to the Book of Acts, and according to the Catholic Encyclopedia, the location of "the first Christian church". The apostles lived and taught there for some time after Pentecost.

The apostles Barnabas and Paul went to Jerusalem to meet with the "Pillars of the Church": James the Just, Peter, and John. Acts 15 and Galatians 2 both suggest that the meeting was called to debate the legitimacy of the Evangelizing mission of Barnabas and Paul to the Gentiles and the Gentile converts' freedom from most of the Mosaic Law, especially from the circumcision of males, a practice that was considered execrable and repulsive in the Greco-Roman world during the period of Hellenization of the Eastern Mediterranean, and was especially adversed in Classical civilization both from ancient Greeks and Romans, which instead valued the foreskin positively.

At the time, most followers of Jesus (which historians refer to as Jewish Christians) were Jewish by birth and even converts would have considered the early Christians as a part of Judaism. According to scholars, the Jewish Christians affirmed every aspect of the then contemporary Second Temple Judaism with the addition of the belief that Jesus was the Jewish Messiah.

Issues and outcome

The purpose of the meeting, according to Acts, was to resolve a disagreement in Antioch, which had wider implications than just circumcision, since circumcision is considered the "everlasting" sign of the Abrahamic covenant in Judaism. The Acts say that "certain men which came down from Judaea" were preaching that  you are circumcised according to the custom of Moses, you cannot be saved"; the Acts also states that furthermore some of the Pharisees who had become believers stated that it was "needful to circumcise [the Gentiles,] and to command [them] to keep the law of Moses" (KJV).

The primary issue which was addressed related to the requirement of circumcision, as the author of Acts relates, but other important matters arose as well, as the Apostolic Decree indicates. The dispute was between those, such as the followers of the "Pillars of the Church", led by James, who believed, following his interpretation of the Great Commission, that the church must observe the Torah, i.e. the rules of traditional Judaism, and Paul the Apostle, who called himself "Apostle to the Gentiles", who believed there was no such necessity. The main concern for the Apostle Paul, which he subsequently expressed in greater detail with his letters directed to the early Christian communities in Asia Minor, was the inclusion of Gentiles into God's New Covenant, sending the message that faith in Christ is sufficient for salvation.

At the council, following advice offered by Simon Peter ( and ), Barnabas and Paul gave an account of their ministry among the gentiles, and the apostle James quoted from the words of the prophet Amos (quoting ). James added his own words to the quotation: "Known to God from eternity are all His works" and then submitted a proposal, which was accepted by the Church and became known as the Apostolic Decree:

 sets out the content of the letter written in accordance with James' proposal. The Western version of Acts (see Acts of the Apostles: Manuscripts) adds the negative form of the Golden Rule ("and whatever things ye would not have done to yourselves, do not do to another").

This determined questions wider than that of circumcision, particularly dietary questions, but also fornication and idolatry and blood, and also the application of Biblical law to non-Jews. It was stated by the Apostles and Elders in the council: "the Holy Spirit and we ourselves have favored adding no further burden to you, except these necessary things, to abstain from things sacrificed to idols, and from blood, and from things strangled, and from fornication. If you carefully keep yourselves from these things, you will prosper." (Acts 15:27–28) And this Apostolic Decree was considered binding on all the other local Christian congregations in other regions.

The author of Acts gives an account of a restatement by James and the elders in Jerusalem of the contents of the letter on the occasion of Paul's final Jerusalem visit, immediately prior to Paul's arrest at the temple, recounting: "When we had come to Jerusalem, the brothers received us gladly. On the following day Paul went in with us to James, and all the elders were present." (Acts 21:17–18, ESV) The elders then proceed to notify Paul of what seems to have been a common concern among Jewish believers, that he was teaching Diaspora Jewish converts to Christianity "to forsake Moses, telling them not to circumcise their children or walk according to our customs." They remind the assembly that, "as for the Gentiles who have believed, we have sent a letter with our judgment that they should abstain from what has been sacrificed to idols, and from blood, and from what has been strangled, and from sexual immorality". In the view of some scholars, the reminder of James and the elders here is an expression of concern that Paul was not fully teaching the decision of the Jerusalem Council's letter to Gentiles, particularly in regard to non-strangled kosher meat, which contrasts with Paul's advice to Gentiles in Corinth, to "eat whatever is sold in the meat markets" (1 Corinthians 10:25).

Historicity

The description of the Apostolic Council in Acts 15, generally considered the same event described in Galatians 2, is considered by some scholars to be contradictory to the Galatians account. The historicity of Luke's account has been challenged, and was rejected completely by some scholars in the mid to late 20th century. However, more recent scholarship inclines towards treating the Jerusalem Council and its rulings as a historical event, though this is sometimes expressed with caution. Bruce Metzger's Textual Commentary on the Greek New Testament includes a summary of current research on the topic as of about 1994:

Interpreting the Council's decision

The council retained the prohibitions on eating blood, meat containing blood, and meat of animals that were strangled, and on fornication and idolatry. The resulting Apostolic Decree in Acts 15 may simply parallel the seven Noahide laws found in the Old Testament, and thus be a commonality rather than a differential. However, modern scholars dispute the connection between Acts 15 and the seven Noahide laws. The Apostolic Decree may have been a major act of differentiation of the early Church from its Jewish roots.

The Jewish Encyclopedia states:

The Jewish Encyclopedia also states:

According to the 19th-century German Catholic bishop Karl Josef von Hefele, the Apostolic Decree "has been obsolete for centuries in the West", though it is still recognized and observed by Eastern Orthodox Christians.

The 20th-century American Catholic priest and biblical scholar Joseph A. Fitzmyer  disputes the claim that the Apostolic Decree is based on the seven Noahide laws, and instead proposes  as the basis for it. (See also: Leviticus 18).

See also

 Ancient church councils (pre-ecumenical)
 Antinomianism
 Biblical law in Christianity
 Binding and loosing
 Christian ethics
 Circumcision controversy in early Christianity
 Circumcision in the Bible#In rabbinic literature
 Circumcision in the Bible
 Incident at Antioch
 Jewish Christians
 Judaizers
 Legalism (theology)
 New Perspective on Paul
 Pauline Christianity

Notes

References

Further reading
 Badenas, Robert. Christ the End of the Law, Romans 10.4 in Pauline Perspective, 1985 
 Brown, Raymond E. An Introduction to the New Testament. Anchor Bible Series, 1997. .
 Bruce, Frederick Fyvie. Peter, Stephen, James and John: Studies in Early Non-Pauline Christianity
 Bruce, Frederick Fyvie. Men and movements in the primitive church: Studies in early non-Pauline Christianity
 Clark, A.C. The Acts of the Apostles,  A critical edition with Introduction and Notes on selected passages, Oxford, Clarendon Press, 1933
 Dunn, James D.G. "The Incident at Antioch," JSNT 18, 1983, pg 95–122
 Dunn, James D.G. Jesus, Paul and the Law, 
 Dunn, James D.G. The Theology of Paul's Letter to the Galatians 1993 
 Dunn, James D.G. The Theology of Paul the Apostle Eerdmans 1997 
 Ehrman, Bart D. Lost Christianities: The Battle for Scripture and the Faiths We Never Knew 2003
 Eisenman, Robert, 1997. James the Brother of Jesus: The Key to Unlocking the Secrets of Early Christianity and the Dead Sea Scrolls.  A cultural historian's dissenting view based on contemporary texts.
 Elsner, Jas. Imperial Rome and Christian Triumph: Oxford History of Early Non-Pauline Christianity 1998 
 Gaus, Andy. The Unvarnished New Testament 1991 
 Keener, Craig S. Acts: An Exegetical Commentary: Volume 3, 15:1–23:35. Grand Rapids: Baker, 2014. 
 Kim, Seyoon Paul and the New Perspective: Second Thoughts on the Origin of Paul's Gospel 2001 

 Maccoby, Hyam. The Mythmaker: Paul and the Invention of Christianity. New York: Harper & Row, 1986. .
 MacDonald, Dennis Ronald, 1983. The Legend and the Apostle: The Battle for Paul in Story and Canon Philadelphia: Westminster Press.
 Metzger, Bruce M. A Textual Commentary on the Greek New Testament 1975 
 Mount, Christopher N. Pauline Christianity: Luke-Acts and the Legacy of Paul 2001
 Ropes, J.H., The Text of Acts, Vol. III; The Beginnings of Christianity: Part I: The Acts of the Apostles, London: MacMillan & Co., Ltd., 1926
 Sanders, E.P. Paul and Palestinian Judaism: A Comparison of Patterns of Religion 1977 
 Sanders, E.P. Paul the Law and the Jewish People 1983
 Sanders, E.P. Jesus and Judaism, Fortress Press, 1987, 
 Savelle, Charles. “A Reexamination of the Prohibitions in Acts 15.” Bibliotheca Ssacra 161 (2004): 449–68.
 Simon, Marcel. The Apostolic Decree and its Setting in the Ancient Church. Bulletin of the John Rylands Library, LII (1969–70), pp. 437–460
 Telfer, W. The Didache and the Apostolic Synod of Antioch The Journal of Theological Studies, 1939, pp. 133–146, 258–271
 Westerholm, Stephen. Perspectives Old and New on Paul: The "Lutheran" Paul and His Critics 2003 
 Wright, N.T. What Saint Paul Really Said: Was Paul of Tarsus the Real Founder of Christianity? 1997

External links

 1
1st century in Jerusalem
50
50s in the Roman Empire
Acts of the Apostles
Ancient Christian controversies
Christianity in Jerusalem
Christian terminology
Commandments
Judaism in the New Testament
Biblical law
Mosaic law in Christian theology
James, brother of Jesus
Saint Peter